The Wildi Frau is a mountain of the Bernese Alps, overlooking the Hohtürli Pass in the Bernese Oberland. It lies between the valleys of Kandersteg and Kiental, north of the Blüemlisalp. It lies 60 km at the southwest of the capital, Bern. The width on its base is 0.65 km.

The terrain around the Wildi Frau is mainly rocky. The nearest peak is the Wyssi Frau, at 3,650 m above the sea level, 1.4 km at the south of the Wildi Frau. The nearest community is Frutigen, 13.6 km at the northwest of Wildi Frau.

The area around the Wildi Frau is permanently covered with ice and snow and very sparsely populated, with 6 inhabitants per square kilometer.

References

External links
 Wildi Frau on Hikr

Mountains of the Alps
Alpine three-thousanders
Mountains of Switzerland
Mountains of the canton of Bern